Hung Shih-han (born 18 January 1990) is a Taiwanese badminton player who competed at the 2010 Guangzhou Asian Games. In 2008, she won the Hellas International Series tournament in the women's singles event after beat Dimitria Popstoikova of Bulgaria. In 2014, she also won the Vietnam International Challenge tournament.

Achievements

BWF International Challenge/Series 
Women's singles

Women's doubles

  BWF International Challenge tournament
  BWF International Series tournament
  BWF Future Series tournament

References

External links 
 

Taiwanese female badminton players
1990 births
Living people
Badminton players at the 2010 Asian Games
Badminton players at the 2014 Asian Games
Asian Games competitors for Chinese Taipei
21st-century Taiwanese women